Crozet  is a census-designated place (CDP) in Albemarle County in the Commonwealth of Virginia, United States. Originally called "Wayland's Crossing," it was renamed in 1870 in honor of Colonel Claudius Crozet, the French-born civil engineer who directed the construction of the Blue Ridge Tunnel. The cornerstone of Crozet is believed to have been Pleasant Green, a property also known as the Ficklin-Wayland Farm, located yards from the actual Wayland Crossing. Claudius Crozet is said to have lodged in that property while surveying the land that today honors his name. The population of Crozet was 5,565 at the 2010 census. Crozet is part of the Charlottesville Metropolitan Statistical Area.

The Crozet Historic District was listed on the National Register of Historic Places in 2012.

Geography
Crozet is located at  (38.069922, −78.701576).

According to the United States Census Bureau, the CDP has a total area of 9.7 km (3.7 mi), all land.

Demographics

As of the census of 2010, there were 5,565 people, 2,119 households, and 1,522 families residing in the CDP. The population density was 1,504.1 people per square mile (573.7/km). There were 2,229 housing units at an average density of 602.4/sq mi (229.8/km). The racial makeup of the CDP was 90.2% White, 4.1% African American, 0.1% Native American, 3.3% Asian, 0.6% from other races, and 1.8% from two or more races. Hispanic or Latino of any race were 3.1% of the population.

There were 2,119 households, out of which 40.3% had children under the age of 18 living with them, 59.7% were married couples living together, 9.8% had a female householder with no husband present, and 28.2% were non-families. 23.7% of all households were made up of individuals, and 10.7% had someone living alone who was 65 years of age or older. The average household size was 2.62 and the average family size was 3.15.

In the CDP, the population was spread out, with 29.8% under the age of 18, 4.4% from 18 to 24, 27.8% from 25 to 44, 26.2% from 45 to 64, and 11.9% who were 65 years of age or older. The median age was 38.3 years. For every 100 females, there were 88 males. For every 100 females age 18 and over, there were 87 males.

The median income for a household in the CDP was $68,608, and the median income for a family was $85,976. Males had a median income of $53,415 versus $41,292 for females. The per capita income for the CDP was $32,266. About 4.6% of families and 7.1% of the population were below the poverty line, including 6.2% of those under age 18 and 14.4% of those age 65 or over.

Education

Schools

Crozet is served by Western Albemarle High School, J. T. Henley Middle School, Brownsville Elementary School, Meriwether
Lewis Elementary School, Murray Elementary School and Crozet Elementary School.  All schools in Crozet are part of Albemarle County Public Schools. They are situated along Highway 250 and nearby to Interstate 64.

Western Albemarle High School is a public high school serving the central area of Albemarle County. The school was opened in September 1977. It is situated at the foot of the Blue Ridge Mountains on a  site and has an approximate enrollment of 1,100 students. The school's athletic mascot is the Warrior. The school is known for its strong academic, as well as athletic performances.

It was first opened in 1966. The school was built using the same blueprints as Journey Middle School. However, after a renovation/addition in 1999, the two schools differ slightly in design. Henley has a capacity of 690 students, although as of 2006 only 597 students were enrolled with 72 faculty members. By 2020, the student enrollment neared 1,000. The school's athletics mascot is the Hornets, and the current principal is Ms. LaRuth Ensley. 

Directly opposite from Henley Middle School, on the same side of Route 250, is Brownsville Elementary, which shares an entrance from the highway with the middle school. Brownsville Elementary students graduate from the school to attend Henley Middle School.

Crozet Elementary School  (the newer building) is located in rural Crozet on Crozet Avenue, across the street from the original Crozet Elementary building. Named after Claudius Crozet, the school feeds into J. T. Henley Middle School. Crozet Elementary teaches kindergarten-5th grade. It has about 402 students.

Other schools that feed into Henley are Meriwether Lewis Elementary and Murray Elementary, both of which are located in the vicinity of Ivy, Virginia.

Crozet is represented on the Albemarle County School Board by two elected members, David Oberg, who represents the White Hall Magisterial District and Jonathan Alcarro, the At-Large member of the School Board.  Both Mr. Oberg and Mr. Alcarro were elected to four year terms in November 2015.

Library
Crozet is also home to a branch of the Jefferson-Madison Regional Library System.  The Crozet Library was housed in a railway depot which was built in 1923 by the Chesapeake and Ohio Railway.
The new Crozet Library is [http://realcrozetva.com/2012/12/10/bricking-of-the-crozet-library/ now open. The Crozet/Western Albemarle Library, now open 52 hours each week, is a permanent public space that encourages and nurtures intellectual freedom and curiosity, and supports JMRL’s mission to help its communities grow, learn and connect. The building is designed to provide a collection of over 75,000 books. In addition to being an anchor for an active, growing community, the library stands as a permanent testament to the County and citizenry's dedication to lifelong learning.

Recreation

Because of Crozet's location in the foothills of the Blue Ridge Mountains, its natural scenery is one of its distinguishing features.  Outdoor activity is popular among residents and visitors.
 Claudius Crozet Park  is a  501(c)(3) non-profit community-owned and operated park open to the public. The Park's expansive green spaces support a variety of activities. Amenities include beautifully maintained athletic fields for soccer, baseball, softball, and t-ball. The Park also offers Quickstart tennis and pickleball courts, playgrounds, par-course systems, a fenced-in dog park, an .85-mile paved perimeter trail, outdoor basketball courts, two large covered pavilions, a one-acre pond stocked with fish, and an 8-lane, 25M all-season swimming pool as part of the Crozet Park Aquatics and Fitness Center (CPAFC).  The CPAFC offers members year-round aquatics amenities, indoor fitness, group exercise classes, youth programming including after-school and summer camps. The facility, located inside Claudius Crozet Park, is operated by acac Fitness & Wellness Centers. The CPAFC also hosts several competitive swim teams including the Crozet Gators Swim Team (CGST) and the Shenandoah Marlins Aquatic Club (SMAC). The CGST which regularly attracts over 300 swimmers, was the Jefferson Swim League champions for the first time in 2013. The CPAFC is also the home pool for the Western Albemarle High School swim team which has won numerous regional and state titles. 
Between Memorial Day and Labor Day, the park's artificial beach is opened to the public and staffed with lifeguards.
 Beaver Creek Lake consists of  land and  water. Though no swimming is allowed, electric powered boats and crafts are welcomed. Beaver Creek Lake is stocked with sunfish, channel catfish, and largemouth bass.

Economy 
Historically, Crozet was strategically important as a depot and transportation hub for the local apple and peach growing industries. Morton Frozen Foods had its flagship manufacturing plant in Crozet from August 1, 1953, until the late 1990s.  In 2000, the plant was closed by food packaging company ConAgra Foods, which owned the brand, laying off more than 600 employees.  As of 2016, Musictoday, acquired in 2014 by San Francisco-based Delivery Agent Inc., an interactive entertainment-commerce firm, operates out of the building, as does Starr Hill Brewery, which moved from Charlottesville in 2006.

From 1990 to 2005, Crozet saw increasing housing development, in part because of nearby Charlottesville's reputation as a desirable location, but also because Albemarle County named Crozet as a designated growth area. Some 95% of the County remains designated as rural.

In 2001, the Albemarle County Board of Supervisors approved a framework dubbed the "Crozet Master Plan", developed by a local architect and regional planning firm, to regulate development patterns and provide a public forum for discussing the topic. The Master Plan allows the population of Crozet, then around 3,000, to quadruple to more than 12,000 by the 2020s. These numbers alarmed some long-time residents who are accustomed to the rural tranquility of Crozet; more than a thousand people petitioned the county to reduce the number of planned households. In 2006, a plan was approved to redevelop the old Barnes Lumber property, which encompasses much of the downtown section. In 2007, the population passed 7,000.

Around 2017, a complex of luxury apartments and various restaurants and shops was built in downtown Crozet. Called the Piedmont Place, it houses restaurants like Smoked Kitchen and Tap and The Rooftop. It also houses Morsel Compass and Crozet Creamery.

Culture 

Traditionally a railroad town with farming and orchards, Crozet has become much more culturally diverse since the turn of the century (2000).  Many of the new residents are outdoor enthusiasts. Home based, online employment is common and many work professional jobs in nearby Charlottesville.  Wineries and breweries have blossomed in the area providing tourism and employment. 

Crozet is home to several popular festivals all taking place at community-owned Crozet Park. These festivals include the award-winning semi-annual Crozet Arts and Crafts Festival on Mother's Day weekend and the second weekend of October. Now in its 42nd year, the Arts and Crafts festivals feature over 120 artists from along the east coast, local wines, ciders and beers, live entertainment and local food trucks. In early July, Crozet holds an Independence Day celebration, which consists of a parade through the downtown area ending at Crozet Park where attendees gather to watch fireworks. Additionally, Crozet Park hosts the Winter Brews Festival the first Saturday of December. This event features locally crafted dark beers, live entertainment, local food trucks and a winter market. Proceeds from the Arts and Crafts and Winter Brews festivals support Crozet Park. 

 The 2007 comedy film Evan Almighty (the sequel to Bruce Almighty) was partially filmed in Crozet.  The ark seen in the movie, as well as the set for Evan's neighborhood, was constructed there.  The film set was situated on a plot of land across from Western Albemarle High School, Old Trail, which later became a popular housing subdivision.

Author Rita Mae Brown has written a mystery series commonly called the 'Mrs. Murphy series' that takes place in Crozet.

Notable people
Muhammad Ali, boxer, owned a farm outside Crozet.
Billy Wagner, baseball player.
Rita Mae Brown, author and activist
Ellis Paul, singer\songwriter and leading figure in the Boston Folk movement.
 Remedy Rule, Olympian, swimmer

References

External links

 Albemarle County website
 Crozet Gazette, monthly newspaper
 Crozet Volunteer Fire Department, fire department website
  Mrs. Murphy mysteries set in Crozet

 
Census-designated places in Virginia
Census-designated places in the Charlottesville, Virginia metropolitan area
Census-designated places in Albemarle County, Virginia